Hugh McInnis was a professional American football player who played tight end for five seasons for the St. Louis Cardinals, and Detroit Lions.

McInnis played at the University of Southern Mississippi before being drafted by the St. Louis Cardinals in the 3rd round of the 1960 NFL draft.

McInnis died on July 18, 2019 at the age of 80.

References

1938 births
2019 deaths
American football tight ends
Detroit Lions players
St. Louis Cardinals (football) players
Southern Miss Golden Eagles football players
Sportspeople from Mobile, Alabama